Lebret is a village in the Canadian province of Saskatchewan within the Rural Municipality of North Qu'Appelle No. 187 and Census Division No. 6. The village is situated on Mission Lake of the Fishing Lakes in the Qu'Appelle Valley. The village was named after "the parish priest, Father Louis Lebret, who became the first postmaster of the community and, although he only held the position for a little more than six months, the office was named Lebret and the name became that of the community."

History 

The site of Lebret first came to non-First Nations attention in 1814 when Abbé Provencher visited. A further such visit occurred when Abbé Picard from Pembina arrived in 1841 and wintered with John McDonald, previously of the North-West Company. The next record of visit is of Bishop Taché passing through in 1864 enroute to Ile á la Crosse, returning with a party and staying in Fort Qu’Appelle. He chose the site which later became the village of Lebret for the Catholic mission, established the next year in 1866 (one of the earliest) in what became the Province of Saskatchewan in 1905.

It "became the main centre of Catholicism for the Métis and First Nations people in the region and a base for Oblate priests who travelled the southern plains to points such as Wood Mountain and the Cypress Hills." The federal government financed the Qu'Appelle Indian Residential School in Lebret. which started in 1884 and run by the Missionary Oblates of Mary Immaculate. The first post office was opened in 1886, named Lebret which was given to the community. The Sisters of Our Lady of the Missions arrived in 1899 and founded Saint Gabriel's Convent in 1906.

Lebret incorporated as a village on October 14, 1912. The fieldstone Sacred Heart Church built in 1925. Churchgoing vastly waned among the Baby-Boom Generation to all but fundamentalist denominations beginning in the mid-1960s but full-house concerts were held in Sacred Heart Church by choirs of the nearby Saskatchewan Summer School of the Arts in Fort San. This ceased when the Summer School closed in 1991 due to lack of funding.

 
In 1929 the landmark stations of the cross and the small chapel shrine on the hill overlooking Lebret were erected. Until the latter half of the 20th century Lebret was an important religious and educational centre. In addition to the residential school and the convent, there was a public school, and the Oblates established a theological training centre, Sacred Heart Scholasticate, on the south side of Mission Lake.

The scholasticate closed in the 1960s, the convent in the 1970s and the public school in 1980, its pupils transferring to Fort Qu’Appelle. The residential school was signed over to a First Nations school board in October 1973, at a ceremony presided over by the then Minister of Indian Affairs, Jean Chrétien. The school, which eventually became known as White Calf Collegiate, closed in 1998.

It is still stated, though with its continuing relevance not dwelled upon, that "French Canadians continued to supplement the Métis in the Qu’Appelle Valley" and that "[t]he mission at Lebret was established in 1866.

Lebret is well known for the "Garbage House" Made famous by Adam Opdahl"

Today, Lebret remains a picturesque, yet very quiet, community with Fort Qu'Appelle now relatively unique in retaining its vitality and even sometimes increasing in population while other towns once of equal significance and size steadily dwindle in population and economic activity.

Demographics 

Economy 
At various times during the village's history, there were numerous businesses including a gas station, diner, grain elevator, pawn shop, ice cream store, and hardware store.

Image gallery

See also
 Lebret Eagles, defunct junior hockey team based in Lebret
 List of communities in Saskatchewan
 Villages of Saskatchewan
 Qu'Appelle Valley

References

External links

Villages in Saskatchewan
North Qu'Appelle No. 187, Saskatchewan
Division No. 6, Saskatchewan
Populated places established in the 1880s